Ralph Adam Heck (born November 6, 1941) is a former American football linebacker who played nine seasons in the National Football League for the Philadelphia Eagles, Atlanta Falcons, and the New York Giants.  He played college football at the University of Colorado.

1941 births
Living people
American football linebackers
Atlanta Falcons players
Colorado Buffaloes football players
New York Giants players
Philadelphia Eagles players
Players of American football from Pittsburgh